Manduca corumbensis is a moth of the  family Sphingidae.

Distribution 
It is known from Bolivia and Brazil.

Description 
The length of the forewings is about 56 mm. The antennae are white and brown. The Head, thorax and abdomen uppersides are grey. The wings have both brown and white fringes. The forewing upperside is also mixed white and brown. The basal half of the forewing underside is dark brown, with lighter areas. The hindwing upperside is dirty white bordered by a brown band basally, but otherwise grey.

Biology 
Adults have been recorded in November and December in Bolivia.

References

Manduca
Moths described in 1920